How To Lose A Battle is a book published in 2006.

Contents
How To Lose A Battle is a short collection of essays by various contributors that "chart the course of military disasters from the crushing defeat of Darius of Persia at Arbela in 331 BC to the 1954 slaughter of the French forces at Dien Bien Phu in Vietnam."

Publication history
How To Lose A Battle was published by HarperCollins, and edited by Bill Fawcett.

Reception
Nick Baumann of Commonweal comments: "The strength of the anthology is that every essay manages to be concise and fast-paced without sacrificing narrative drama. If we hope to make the right decisions about Iraq, we must understand why some battles are lost when they might have been won. Fawcett excels in offering the reader an understanding of these historical debacles."

The Historical Novel Society didn't give the book a favorable review, noting several errors and pointing out that the book is a collection of essays by authors of unknown reputation.

References

2006 non-fiction books